Mafaldine, also known as reginette (Italian for "little queens") or simply mafalda or mafalde, is a type of ribbon-shaped pasta. It is flat and wide, usually about 1 cm (½ inch) in width, with wavy edges on both sides. It is prepared similarly to other ribbon-based pasta such as linguine and fettuccine. It is usually served with a more delicate sauce.

Mafaldine were named in honor of Princess Mafalda of Savoy (thus the alternative name "little queens").

See also
 Pasta
 List of pasta

References

External links
 Mafaldine at the Pasta Project

Neapolitan cuisine
Types of pasta